William R. Etnyre (born March 5, 1931) is a retired lieutenant general in the United States Marine Corps. He is a former Commanding General of the Marine Corps Combat Development Command. Entyre was a former enlisted marine before he received a commission in 1953.

References

United States Marine Corps generals
1931 births
Living people